Mohammad Etemadi (Persian: محمد اعتمادی) is an Iranian professor in electrical engineering and a professor at Sharif University of Technology since 1986. He attended Shiraz University, where he received a BS degree. He got his PhD in electrical engineering from University of California, Los Angeles. He served as  the chancellor of Sharif University of Technology for a period of two years 1993–1995.

References

Academic staff of Sharif University of Technology
Chancellors of the Sharif University of Technology
Living people
UCLA Henry Samueli School of Engineering and Applied Science alumni
Year of birth missing (living people)